HMS Achilles was a  armoured cruiser built for the Royal Navy in the first decade of the 20th century. She served with the 2nd Cruiser Squadron for most of the First World War. The ship did not participate in the Battle of Jutland in 1916, but did sink the German raider Leopard in 1917. Achilles became a training ship in 1918 and was sold for scrap in 1921.

General description

Achilles displaced  as built and  fully loaded. The engines were powered by 19 Yarrow water-tube boilers and six cylindrical boilers.

Armament
Her main armament consisted of six BL  Mark X guns in single Mk V turrets distributed in two centerline turrets (one each fore and one aft) and four turrets disposed in the corners about the funnels. Her secondary armament of four BL  Mark II or Mark V guns in single Mk II turrets was carried amidships, between the wing 9.2-inch guns. Twenty-six Vickers QF 3-pounders were fitted, ten on turret roofs and eight each on the forward and aft superstructures. The last four ships of the  cruisers had a secondary armament of turreted 7.5-inch guns rather than the  guns in open barbettes of the first two ships; these latter four were sometimes referred to as the Warrior class. Because of the extra topweight of the turrets in comparison to their half-sisters their stability was reduced which made them very good seaboats and steady gun platforms because they did not roll as much. The ship also mounted three submerged  torpedo tubes, one of which was mounted in the stern.

Wartime modifications
A single Hotchkiss QF 6-pounder anti-aircraft gun on a high-angle Mark Ic mounting was mounted on the quarterdeck in 1915. It had a maximum depression of 8° and a maximum elevation of 60°. Achilless foremast was converted to a tripod mast to support the weight of a fire-control director after the Battle of Jutland in 1916, but when the director was actually fitted is not known.

Construction and career
Achilles was ordered as part of the 1903–04 naval construction programme as the third of four armoured cruisers. She was laid down on 22 February 1904 at Elswick by Armstrong Whitworth. The ship was launched on 17 June 1905 and completed on 22 April 1907 at the cost of £1,191,103. Like her sister ships, she joined the 5th Cruiser Squadron in 1907, and made a port visit to Russia in 1908. The ship was later transferred to the 2nd Cruiser Squadron in 1909. Achilles, accompanied by her sister , and three other armoured cruisers were sent to reinforce the defences of the Shetland Islands on 2 August 1914, days before the start of the First World War. She, and her squadron, was assigned to the Grand Fleet after the beginning of the war.

Achilles missed the Battle of Jutland on 31 May 1916 because she was refitting. On the evening of 18 August, the Grand Fleet put to sea in response to a deciphered message that the High Seas Fleet, minus the II Battle Squadron, would be leaving harbour that night. The Germans planned to bombard the port of Sunderland on 19 August, with extensive reconnaissance provided by airships and submarines. The Germans broke off their planned attack to pursue a lone British battle squadron reported by an airship, which was in fact the Harwich Force under Commodore Tyrwhitt. Realising their mistake, the Germans then set course for home. During the Grand Fleet's sortie, Achilles spotted a U-boat. During another sortie by the High Seas Fleet on 18 October 1916, Achilles and three other armoured cruisers were ordered to patrol the northern end of the North Sea, between the approaches to Pentland Firth and Hardangerfjord in Norway, but they saw no German ships.

On 16 March 1917, Achilles and the armed boarding steamer  were patrolling north of the Shetland Islands when they encountered the disguised German auxiliary cruiser Leopard. The latter ship heaved to when commanded, but manoeuvred to prevent Dundee from boarding her and then fired two torpedoes which missed. Dundee retaliated by raking Leopards stern, badly damaging the German ship and then Achilles opened fire herself. The German ship sank an hour later with no survivors. Achilles was transferred to the North America and West Indies Station in August 1917 for convoy escort duties, but returned to Britain for a refit between February and December 1918. Upon completion of this refit Achilles became a stoker's training ship at Chatham. The ship was sold for scrap on 9 May 1921.

Footnotes

References

External links

 
 OldWeather.org transcription of ship's logbooks September 1916 to December 1918

 

Warrior-class cruisers
Ships built by Armstrong Whitworth
Ships built on the River Tyne
World War I cruisers of the United Kingdom
1905 ships